Antonio Maria Vegliò (born 3 February 1938) is an Italian Cardinal of the Roman Catholic Church, who has served as Vatican diplomat and in the Roman Curia. He was President of the Pontifical Council for the Pastoral Care of Migrants and Itinerants. Vegliò was created a Cardinal by Pope Benedict XVI on 18 February 2012.

Early life and ordination
Born in Macerata Feltria, Italy, Vegliò was ordained a priest for the diocese of Pesaro in 1962. He attended the Pontifical Ecclesiastical Academy where he studied diplomacy. Besides his native Italian, he speaks English, French and Spanish.

Nuncio
He was appointed Titular Archbishop of  Eclano and was appointed Apostolic Pro-Nuncio to Papua New Guinea and the Solomon Islands on 27 July 1985.

In 1989, Vegliò was appointed Apostolic Pro-Nuncio to Senegal, Guinea-Bissau, and Cape Verde, and Apostolic Delegate to Mauritania on 21 October and on 25 November Pro-Nuncio to Mali. He was promoted to full Apostolic Nuncio to four of those countries—all but Mauritania—in December 1994.

On 2 October 1997, Pope John Paul II named him Apostolic Nuncio to Lebanon and Kuwait a well as Apostolic Delegate to the Arabian Peninsula.

Curial work
On 11 April 2001, Vegliò was named Secretary of the Vatican Congregation for the Oriental Churches.  On 28 February 2009, he was named President of the Pontifical Council for the Pastoral Care of Migrants and Itinerants.

Pope Benedict XVI announced on 6 January 2012 that Vegliò would be created cardinal. On 18 February he became Cardinal-Deacon of San Cesareo in Palatio. On 21 April 2012 Vegliò was named a member of the Congregation for Divine Worship and the Discipline of the Sacraments and the Pontifical Council for the Family and the Pontifical Council for the Laity.

In 2009, he organised the first European meeting of the pastoral care of people on the streets, such as drug users, street women, children, and the homeless. He has intervened several times in the public debate in support of the rights of migrants, refugees, immigrants, displaced persons, or other persons disadvantaged because of their status in mobility. He speaks out against piracy which he says infests the seas, and launched a campaign of solidarity with seafarers and their families affected by the tsunami in Japan.

He was one of the cardinal electors who participated in the 2013 papal conclave that elected Pope Francis.

Pope Francis appointed Vegliò to the Pontifical Commission for Vatican City State on 1 June 2013.

On 4 March 2022, he was elevated to the rank of cardinal priest.

Views

Rights of migrants
In August 2009, he lamented the deaths of more than 70 Eritreans trying to reach Italy in a boat and implicitly criticized the Berlusconi government's tough new policies on immigration.

Swiss ban on minarets
Vegliò declared that the popular vote held in Switzerland against the construction of additional minarets was a heavy blow for religious freedom and integration in that country. His colleague Agostino Marchetto expressed a somewhat different view, arguing that the Swiss vote did not compromise religious freedom.

References

External links 

 
 Catholic-Hierarchy.org 

1938 births
Living people
Cardinals created by Pope Benedict XVI
People from Pesaro
Pontifical Ecclesiastical Academy alumni
20th-century Italian Roman Catholic titular archbishops
21st-century Italian cardinals
Pontifical Council for the Pastoral Care of Migrants and Itinerants
Members of the Congregation for Divine Worship and the Discipline of the Sacraments
Apostolic Nuncios to Lebanon
Apostolic Nuncios to Senegal
Apostolic Nuncios to Guinea-Bissau
Apostolic Nuncios to Cape Verde
Apostolic Nuncios to Mali
Apostolic Nuncios to Papua New Guinea
Apostolic Nuncios to the Solomon Islands
Apostolic Nuncios to Kuwait